Padalino is a surname. Notable people with the surname include:

 Alessia Padalino (born 1984), Dutch-Italian field hockey player
 Marco Padalino (born 1983), Swiss footballer
 Pasquale Padalino (born 1972), Italian footballer and manager